Zhang Hongtao (born 9 April 1986), is a Chinese gymnast. He is a specialist on the pommel horse.

Gymnastics career
In Chinese national level competition, Zhang has made many achievements for the Shanghai team. He earned a bronze medal on pommel horse at the 10th Chinese national games and was selected a national team member since then. He also won gold in the 2007 national championships, and a silver on the same apparatus at the 11th Chinese national games in 2009, behind multiple world pommel horse champion Xiao Qin.

Zhang's first international competition was the 2005 World Artistic Gymnastics Championships. He qualified 3rd into the pommel horse event final with a score of 9.712. In the event final, he scored 9.475 and finished 6th on pommel horse. In 2009, Zhang became the world champion on pommel horse in the 2009 World Artistic Gymnastics Championships, qualified first into the event final and finished with a score of 16.200.

References

External links
 

1986 births
Living people
Chinese male artistic gymnasts
Medalists at the World Artistic Gymnastics Championships
Sportspeople from Xi'an
Gymnasts from Shaanxi
20th-century Chinese people
21st-century Chinese people